Rhipilia is a genus of green algae in the family Rhipiliaceae.

References

Bryopsidales genera